Darryl Jenifer (born October 22, 1960) is an American musician, widely known as the bassist for the hardcore punk band Bad Brains and for the rap-rock group The White Mandingos. He appeared in TV's Illest Minority Moments presented by ego trip and the three-part ego trip's Race-O-Rama on VH1.

Jenifer released his first solo album entitled In Search of Black Judas on October 26, 2010. The album had been in development for nearly a decade.

References

External links
Daryl Jennifer at Bandcamp
Darryl Jenifer Talks Bad Brains, Artwork In New Interview

1960 births
African-American rock musicians
American punk rock bass guitarists
American male bass guitarists
American Rastafarians
Converts to the Rastafari movement
Living people
Guitarists from Washington, D.C.
Bad Brains members
American male guitarists
20th-century American guitarists
African-American guitarists
The White Mandingos members